Craig Clevenger is an American author of contemporary fiction. Born 1964 in Dallas, Texas, he grew up in Southern California where he studied English at California State University, Long Beach. He is the author of two novels, The Contortionist's Handbook and Dermaphoria, both released by MacAdam/Cage. His work has been classified by some as neo-noir and has received praise from such authors as Chuck Palahniuk and Irvine Welsh.

Clevenger lists among his influences Jim Thompson, James M. Cain, Edgar Allan Poe, Richard Matheson, Italo Calvino, Kōbō Abe, Steve Erickson, Mark Danielewski, Will Christopher Baer, Seth Morgan, James Ellroy, Michael Hogan, John O'Brien, Michael Ventura and Rupert Thomson.

Clevenger has completed work on a third novel, Mother Howl, based on his short story The Fade, which he has recently adapted into a short film with director Scott Krinsky.

He shares a fan base with fellow authors Will Christopher Baer and Stephen Graham Jones.

Novels

The Contortionist's Handbook 

Clevenger's debut novel, The Contortionist's Handbook, was first published in 2002. It is the story of John Dolan Vincent, a prodigious forger who has been detained for a psychiatric interview following a near-fatal painkiller overdose. As the narrator bluffs his way through the interview in order to avoid being involuntarily institutionalized, he tells the reader his true story - the one he is not telling the psychiatrist - revealing both his past and the true nature of his circumstances. The Contortionist's Handbook has since been translated into five languages - German, Italian, Polish, Spanish and Brazilian Portuguese - as well as published in the United Kingdom by HarperCollins. Several other translations are forthcoming, including Russian and Japanese. Film rights for The Contortionist's Handbook were optioned in 2007 by Greenestreet Films.  Miguel Sapochnik has been linked as director and Channing Tatum as star.

Dermaphoria

In 2005, MacAdam/Cage released Clevenger's second novel, Dermaphoria, the diary of an amnesiac LSD chemist who becomes addicted to a drug which synthesizes the feeling of human touch. Documentary film maker Ross Clarke will be making his narrative directorial debut with a film adaptation of the book adaptation. It has toured film festivals under the new name "Desiree" and now has a website. It has toured film festivals, and the director says news about its release will be released as soon as they are decided. It was filmed in New Orleans and stars Joseph Morgan, Ron Perlman, Walton Goggins and Kate Walsh. Musician Bill Brown composed the score for the film.

Mother Howl 
Craig Clevenger has announced on his Twitter that the novel "Mother Howl" is complete. It is due to be released by Datura Books (an imprint of Angry Robot Books) in 2023.

References

Sources
 MacAdam/Cage bio for Craig Clevenger
 Transcript of Chuck Palahniuk's Audio Blog Monday, Aug. 18, 2003
 "Tied Up in Knots," Irvine Welsh for "The Guardian," Apr. 16, 2005
 "Greenestreet Books Deal" Variety.com May 2007

Bibliography

Fiction

"The Contortionist's Handbook" 

 Hardcover, 2002; 
 Trade Paper, 2003;

"Dermaphoria" 

 Hardcover, 2005; 
 Trade Paper, 2006;

Short fiction
 "The Fade" on craigclevenger.com (2005)
 "The Numbers Game" in San Francisco Noir 2 (2009)
 "Mother Howl" on chuckpalahniuk.net (2009)
 "Subcarrier" on chuckpalahniuk.net (2009)
 "Mercury" in Sensitive Skin issue 3 (2010)
 "Act of Contrition" in Warmed and Bound (2011)
 "Obsolescence" in In Search of a City: Los Angeles in 1,000 Words (2011)
 "Drunk & DC" in Barrelhouse magazine issue 10 (2012)
 "Chicken Wire" in Black Clock n°16 (2013)
 "The Confession of Adelai Shade" in The Booked. Anthology (2013)
 "Vapor Trail" in The Sunday Rumpus (2014)

Non-Fiction
 "Thirteen Hours at the Oakland Strike" on Huffington Post (2011)
 "Scotty's Last Name" on OccupyWriters.com (2011)
 "Neglected Authors: Seth Morgan" on LitReactor.com (2013)
 "High Priest of the Godless: A Jim Thompson Primer" on LitReactor.com (2013)

Short Film 
"Smoke and Mirrors" (2015) available from Six Finger Films (2015) due to this Kickstarter

External links

Official sites
 Official site of Craig Clevenger
 The Velvet The official online community of Craig Clevenger, Will Christopher Baer and Stephen Graham Jones
 200 Proof Storytelling Workshop A class Craig Clevenger teaches online with LitReactor

Interviews
 Curled Up
 MookyCh!ck
 Movie Poopshoot 1
 Movie Poopshoot 2
 Professor Barnhardt's Journal 1
 Professor Barnhardt's Journal 2
 TastesLikeChicken
 Suicide Girls I
 Suicide Girls II

Audio
 KQED's "The Writer's Block
 Craig Clevenger reading from ''Dermaphoria at Pete's Candy Store in Williamsburg, Brooklyn while on tour in October, 2005
 Misnomer Radio's Logan Rapp interviews Craig Clevenger.

1964 births
21st-century American novelists
Living people
Writers from Dallas
Novelists from Texas
Writers from the San Francisco Bay Area
American male novelists
21st-century American male writers